The 2021 New Zealand Radio Awards are the awards for excellence in the New Zealand radio industry during 2020. It was the 44th New Zealand Radio Awards, recognising staff, volunteers and contractors in both commercial and non-commercial broadcasting.

Winners and nominees
This is a list of nominees, with winners in bold.

Associated Craft Award sponsored by RCS

Best Community Campaign sponsored by Media Chaplaincy New Zealand

Best Content sponsored by Radio New Zealand

Best Hosts sponsored by the RBA

Best New Broadcaster sponsored by the NZ Broadcasting School

Best News & Sport

Best Promotion

Sales Team of the Year

References

New Zealand Radio Awards